Laurie J. Marks (born 1957) is an American author of fantasy novels.

Life 
Inspired by C.S. Lewis, Laurie wrote her first novel at twelve. Her determination to become a fantasy novelist led her to take a typing class and all the writing classes she could. After attending a small Christian college for two years, Laurie transferred to Brown University to finish her degree. After graduating, Laurie roamed around for a few years living in many different places during this time.

In 2003, her novel Fire Logic, the first in her Elemental Logic series, won the Gaylactic Spectrum Award for "best novel"; in 2005 Earth Logic, the second in the series, won the same award.  She teaches writing at the University of Massachusetts Boston and lives with Deb Mensinger. In 2004, Marks and Mensinger married in Massachusetts. In 2007 she was Guest of Honor at the WisCon science fiction convention.

Bibliography

Elemental Logic series 
The Elemental Logic series is set in the world of Shaftal. Some 35 years prior to the first book, Shaftal was invaded by an army of Sainnites who, in an attempt to eradicate the magic which might be used against them, killed all the elemental witches they could locate. However they failed to realise that magic is inherent in the Shaftali and children have been born since who can wield it. Furthermore, the Sainnites have become cut off from their homeland and are subject to constant guerilla action from the Shaftali. Among both the learned, peace-loving Shaftali and the warlike, spartan Sainnites, women and men are equals in all things, including military, and both queer and polyamorous/polygamous relationships are common and accepted.

Children of the Triad series
 
  (Illustrated by Anne Yvonne Gilbert)
  (Illustrated by Anne Yvonne Gilbert)

Other works

References

External links

20th-century American novelists
21st-century American novelists
American fantasy writers
American women short story writers
American women novelists
American lesbian writers
Women science fiction and fantasy writers
Living people
Feminist science fiction
1957 births
20th-century American women writers
21st-century American women writers
20th-century American short story writers
21st-century American short story writers